Teodors Bļugers (anglicized as Theodor "Teddy" Blueger; born 15 August 1994) is a Latvian professional ice hockey centre for the Vegas Golden Knights of the National Hockey League (NHL). He was selected 52nd overall in the 2012 NHL Entry Draft by the Pittsburgh Penguins, making him the third-highest selected Latvian hockey player in the NHL Entry Draft, behind Zemgus Girgensons and Sandis Ozoliņš.

Playing career
Bļugers began playing hockey in BHS hockey school, founded by former Dinamo Rīga player Helmuts Balderis.

In 2009 Bļugers moved to North America to play high school hockey at Shattuck-Saint Mary's in Faribault, Minnesota. He committed to a collegiate career with Minnesota State University, Mankato and played four seasons in the NCAA from 2012 to 2016. Bļugers was named to the All-Tournament Team for the 2014 WCHA Men's Ice Hockey Tournament. In 2015–16, Bļugers was named to the All-WCHA First Team.

On 22 March 2016, Bļugers signed an entry-level agreement with the Pittsburgh Penguins. He finished the 2015–16 season with Penguins' AHL affiliate, the Wilkes-Barre Scranton Penguins playing in 10 games. In his first full season with the Wilkes-Barre/Scranton Penguins, Bļugers set a new franchise record for plus-minus rating by a rookie with a +24.

Bļugers made his NHL debut on 30 January 2019, in Pittsburgh's game against the Tampa Bay Lightning. On 1 February 2019, Bļugers scored his first NHL goal, against the Ottawa Senators in a 5–3 Penguins win.

On 16 July 2019, Bļugers re-signed with the Penguins on a two-year, one-way contract with an average annual value of $750,000. On 14 July 2021, he was re-signed to a two-year, $4.4 million contract extension with the Penguins.

Bļugers was traded to the Vegas Golden Knights on 1 March 2023, in exchange for a third-round pick in 2024 and prospect Peter DiLiberatore.

International play

Bļugers has represented Latvia at the international junior level, appearing in the 2011 IIHF World U18 Championships and four World Junior Ice Hockey Championships. He made his senior debut when he was selected to play for Latvia at the 2017 IIHF World Championship. The following year, he was again named to the Latvia national team to compete at the 2018 IIHF World Championship.

Personal life
Bļugers has a younger brother, Roberts who also plays hockey.

Career statistics

Regular season and playoffs

International

Awards and honours

References

External links
 

1994 births
Living people
Ice hockey people from Riga
Latvian ice hockey centres
Minnesota State Mavericks men's ice hockey players
Minnesota State University, Mankato alumni
Pittsburgh Penguins draft picks
Pittsburgh Penguins players
Vegas Golden Knights players
Wilkes-Barre/Scranton Penguins players